Robert Gess (born 14 August 1985) is a German judoka, who won the World Cup in Rome in 2012.

Achievements

See also
European Judo Championships
German Judo Federation
History of martial arts
Judo in Germany
List of judo techniques
List of judoka
Martial arts timeline

References

1985 births
Living people
German male judoka
Place of birth missing (living people)